is a passenger railway station in located in the city of Miyazu, Kyoto Prefecture, Japan, operated by the private railway company Willer Trains (Kyoto Tango Railway).

Lines
Karakawa Station is a station of the Miyafuku Line, and is located 21.3 kilometers from the terminus of the line at Fukuchiyama Station.

Station layout
The station consists of one side platform serving a single bi-directional track. The station is unattended.

Adjacent stations

History
The station was opened on 16 July 1988.

Passenger statistics
In fiscal 2019, the station was used by an average of 3 passengers daily.

Surrounding area
The station is located in a rural area with few houses near the Hinoki River.

See also
List of railway stations in Japan

References

External links

Official home page 

Railway stations in Kyoto Prefecture
Railway stations in Japan opened in 1988
Miyazu, Kyoto